The Executioner is a 1990 Soviet drama film directed by Viktor Sergeyev.

Plot 
A journalist Olga Privalova becomes a victim of rape. To take revenge on the rapists, she makes a deal with the criminals. However, circumstances begin to unfold unpredictably.

Cast 
 Irina Metlitskaya as Olga Privalova
 Andrey Sokolov as Andrey Arsentyev
 Larisa Guzeeva as Sveta
 Sergey Gazarov as Igor Pogodin
 Boris Galkin as Aleksandr Zavalishin
 Stanislav Sadalskiy as Viktor Goldner
 Aristarkh Livanov as Sergey Gavrilov
 Igor Ageev as doctor
 Yevgeni Aleksandrov as administrator
 Nikolai Kryukov as Olga's grandfather
 Aristarkh Livanov as Sergei Gavrilov
 Algis Matulionis as Waldemar
 Dmitry Nagiyev  as barman

References

External links 
 

1990 films
1990 crime drama films
Lenfilm films
1990s Russian-language films
Soviet crime drama films
Films set in Saint Petersburg
Films about photojournalists
Rape and revenge films
Films scored by Eduard Artemyev